Lezley Zen (born February 19, 1974) is an American pornographic actress.

Early life
Zen was born in Charleston, South Carolina, and is of Cherokee and Irish descent. She attended college for three years and was in a pre-law program. She was the manager of a Westin Hotel restaurant prior to her porn career. She also worked as a bartender in Charleston for eight years.

Career
She entered the adult film industry in 2001 after dancing during amateur night at a strip club where she met a porn star who was feature dancing and suggested she do porn. Her first scene was in Serenity’s Roman Orgy for Wicked Pictures.

In June 2005, Zen relocated from the San Fernando Valley to Miami and signed a non-exclusive, one-year contract with Pink TV.

Personal life
Zen has two children.

Awards and nominations

References

External links 

 
 
 
 

1974 births
American female erotic dancers
American erotic dancers
American people of Cherokee descent
American people of Irish descent
American pornographic film actresses
Living people
Native American pornographic film actors
People from Charleston, South Carolina
Pornographic film actors from South Carolina
21st-century American women